EM4 Electric Trainsets  (Cyrillic ЭМ4, known as "Sputnik") were produced from 2003 to 2006 by the JSC "Spetsremont" factory. Their cars have a common interior space. Each car has three pairs of sliding doors propped-designed only for the high platforms. EM4 "Sputniks” have operated on the following rapid suburban routes:
•	Moscow - Mytischi – Pushkino,
•	Moscow - Mytischi - Bolshevo,
•	Moscow - Lyubertsy 1  – Ramenskoye

Gallery

See also

 The Museum of the Moscow Railway, at Paveletsky Rail Terminal, Moscow
 Rizhsky Rail Terminal, Moscow
 Varshavsky Rail Terminal, St.Petersburg
 Finland Station, St.Petersburg
 History of rail transport in Russia

References

External links
 JSC "Spetsremont" factory (Russian)

EM4

ru:ЭР2#Электропоезда ЭР2К, ЭР2М, ЭМ1, ЭМ2, ЭМ4 и ЭС2